Vínarterta ("Vienna cake"), also known as Randalín ("striped lady cake"), is a multi-layered cake made from alternating layers of almond and/or cardamom-flavoured biscuit and prunes or sometimes plum jam, the filling usually including spices such as cinnamon, vanilla, cloves, and cardamom. Other fillings such as apricot and rhubarb are less well known, but traditional going back to the 19th century. Vinarterta originated in Iceland, but its name and composition both hint at Austrian roots. The recipe was brought to Manitoba by Icelandic immigrants to Canada, many of whom settled at New Iceland.

The cake is now better-known in the Icelandic communities in Canada and the United States than it is in Iceland. The modern Icelandic cake differs from the traditional cake, with common substitutions for the plum jam including cream or strawberries. In New Iceland, substitutions for the filling are discouraged.

The cake is typically served in rectangular slices with coffee. It can be iced with bourbon flavored sugar glaze. 

The cake's history was the subject of a dissertation for a doctorate by historian Laurie Bertram at the University of Toronto.

See also
 Icelandic cuisine
 List of cakes

References

Further reading

Laurie K. Bertram. 2019. "Icelandic Cake Fight: History of an Immigrant Recipe." Gastronomica: The Journal of Critical Food Studies, Vol. 19 No. 4, Winter 2019; (pp. 28–41).

External links
 nb as of December 2018, yields a 404 error.

Cakes
Icelandic cuisine
Canadian cuisine
Shortbread
Wedding food
Christmas cakes
Cuisine of Manitoba